In Sport, a Golden generation, or Golden team is an exceptionally gifted group of players of similar age, whose achievements reach or are expected to reach a level of success beyond that which their team had previously achieved. The term was first being cited by the media for Portugal's success during the FIFA Youth Championships in both 1989 and 1991. Below is a list of teams who have been referred to by the media as golden generations, most of which played in the 21st century.

Basketball

Argentina (2000–2012)
Led by Manu Ginóbili and accompanied by players like Luis Scola, Fabricio Oberto, Carlos Delfino, Andres Nocioni, Pablo Prigioni and Walter Herrmann, the Argentina national basketball team between 2000 and 2012 has been referred to as the "Golden Generation". The team won gold in the Americas Championship 2001, silver in 2002 FIBA World Championship, gold in Basketball at the 2004 Summer Olympics, gold in FIBA Diamond Ball 2008, bronze in Basketball at the 2008 Summer Olympics, and gold in 2011 FIBA Americas Championship, resulting in Argentina reaching the first position in the FIBA Men's Ranking at the end of the 2008 Olympic Games.

Football

Europe

Belgium (2014–2022) 
During the 10 years from 2002 to 2012 in which Belgium failed to qualify for major tournaments, a golden generation matured, many of whom gained both prime individual and team awards in foreign European clubs and competitions. These include defender and former captain Vincent Kompany; Kevin De Bruyne, who is widely regarded as one of the best midfielders of his generation; Eden Hazard, who has been praised as one of the best players of all time; and Romelu Lukaku, who is currently Belgium's all-time top scorer. Other key players of this golden generation include Thibaut Courtois, Jan Vertonghen, Yannick Carrasco, Axel Witsel, Mousa Dembélé, Dries Mertens, and Toby Alderweireld. These players helped Belgium finish in third place at the 2018 FIFA World Cup, the team's best ever performance at the World Cup; and reach number one in the FIFA World Rankings for the first time in November 2015.

At the 2018 FIFA World Cup, Belgium performed excellently, earning themselves a 3rd place finish. Eden Hazard, one of the best footballers in the world,  was one of the main reasons of this success as he won many MOTM awards and broke previous records. He was rewarded with the Silver Ball (2nd best player at the tournament).

Numerous sports commentators mark Belgium's elimination from the 2022 FIFA World Cup as the end of Belgium's golden generation. Kevin De Bruyne stated of Belgium's chance to win the 2022 World Cup: “No chance, we’re too old.”  Eden Hazard stated that "To be fair I think we had a better chance to win four years ago [in 2018]”. Kevin De Bruyne echoed these sentiments, stating “I think our chance was 2018. We have a good team, but it is aging.”  Of the 26 players on the 2022 squad, 11 were at least 30 years old during the 2022 World Cup, including Eden Hazard, Kevin De Bruyne, Dries Mertens, Thomas Meunier, Toby Alderweireld, and Thibaut Courtois. Coach Roberto Martínez resigned following the match after six years with the team.

Croatia (2012–2022) 

The Croatia national football team of the late 2010s was thought of as the "Second Coming of the Golden Generation"; in reference to the Golden Generation of Croatia from the late 1990s who won the bronze medal in at the 1998 FIFA World Cup, Croatia's debut at the World Cup. The team, under the leadership of captain Luka Modrić and the style of play by key players such as Mario Mandžukić, Ivan Rakitić, Ivan Perišić, Vedran Ćorluka and Mateo Kovačić reached the 2018 FIFA World Cup final, losing to France 4–2. The squad were praised for their performance at the World Cup. The team made it to the semi-finals of the 2022 FIFA World Cup.

England (2001–2007) 
During the reign of Sven-Göran Eriksson, Adam Crozier, the chief executive of the Football Association and some members of the British media, touted players such as David Beckham, Michael Owen, and Steven Gerrard as the nucleus of a potential Golden Generation team. Despite some impressive performances such as the 2001 Germany v England football match in the 2002 World Cup qualifiers and the individual players' successes at club level, inconsistency resulted in this group of players failing to live up to expectations, resulting in the group becoming synonymous with disappointment and failed potential.

After Eriksson left in 2006 and Steve McClaren became manager, although many of the players continued to achieve success with their respective clubs, the team failed to qualify for UEFA Euro 2008, only the second time England failed to qualify for a major tournament in over 20 years (of the last 12 major tournaments). Rio Ferdinand claimed that the pressure of the "Golden Generation" tag had a negative effect on the players, restricting their ability to perform to their full potential for the national team. In 2017, Pep Guardiola said he could not understand why England did not achieve more with players such as Frank Lampard, Wayne Rooney, Ashley Cole, Joe Cole, Paul Scholes, Steven Gerrard, John Terry, and Rio Ferdinand and claimed they were on the same level as Spain's golden generation of 2008–2014.

France (1998–2006) 
In late 1998, the France national football team began a period of international dominance defeating Brazil 3–0 to win the 1998 FIFA World Cup, becoming the first French team to win the World Cup. Two years later, David Trezeguet's golden goal in extra time gave France a 2–1 win over Italy to give France the 2000 European Championship. France was subsequently ranked No. 1 in the FIFA World Rankings and ranked No. 1 in the World Football Elo Ratings for two years. The team also secured the 2001 FIFA Confederations Cup. Despite this impressive recent record, the French team flopped at the 2002 FIFA World Cup, losing to newcomers Senegal in the opening match of the tournament and crashing out in the group stages without scoring a single goal and taking only one point from their three games. A year later they were successful at the 2003 FIFA Confederations Cup. They also reached the World Cup final in Berlin at the 2006 FIFA World Cup, where they lost to Italy. The French golden team was composed of players such as Zinedine Zidane, Thierry Henry, David Trezeguet, Lilian Thuram, Laurent Blanc, Robert Pires, Patrick Vieira, Didier Deschamps, Fabien Barthez, Emmanuel Petit, Marcel Desailly, and Bixente Lizarazu.

Germany (2006–2018) 
After disappointing results in UEFA Euro 2000 and UEFA Euro 2004, the Germany national football team reached the semi-finals in the 2006 FIFA World Cup and the finals in the UEFA Euro 2008, losing to the eventual tournament winner both times. With Miroslav Klose, Philipp Lahm, Bastian Schweinsteiger and Per Mertesacker playing a major role in these results already, it was the addition of Manuel Neuer, Jérôme Boateng, Mats Hummels, Sami Khedira, Mesut Özil, Toni Kroos, Mario Götze
and Thomas Müller that pushed Germany to a top-tier world class team. Led by Joachim Löw the team finished in the top 4 in all major tournaments, additionally 2014 winning their first world title after the German reunification in 1990 and reaching first place in the FIFA World Rankings for the first time after 20 years. Commentators mark their early group stage exit from the 2018 FIFA World Cup as the end of their ‘golden generation’ as well as Mesut Özil’s retirement and Thomas Müller, Jerome Boateng and Mats Hummels’ exclusion from the team although Müller and Hummels did return for UEFA Euro 2020 in which Germany were knocked out in the round of 16.

Hungary (1950–1956) 

Between 1950 and 1956, the team recorded 42 victories, 7 draws and just one defeat, in the 1954 World Cup final against West Germany. Under the Elo rating system they achieved the highest rating recorded by a national side (2230 points, 30 June 1954).

Italy (1998–2006) 
The generation of Italian players during the late 1990s and early 2000s was renowned for an elite defense, most notably consisting of Paolo Maldini, Fabio Cannavaro, Alessandro Nesta, Gianluca Zambrotta, and goalkeeper Gianluigi Buffon. Other key players included Alessandro Del Piero, Christian Vieri, Francesco Totti, Filippo Inzaghi, Gennaro Gattuso, and Andrea Pirlo.

This group of players reached their first major final at UEFA Euro 2000, losing to France in extra time. After a round of 16 elimination at the 2002 FIFA World Cup and a group stage exit at UEFA Euro 2004, both under controversial circumstances, they would win the 2006 FIFA World Cup, Italy's fourth ever title at the tournament.

Portugal (2000–2006, 2019–) 
Portugal won consecutive FIFA Youth Championships in 1989 and 1991. Subsequently, Portugal's senior team reached the semi-finals of Euro 2000 and were runners-up at Euro 2004 on home soil. They were also 2006 FIFA World Cup semi-finalists. Some critics have written that this generation underachieved at international level. It included players such as Rui Costa, João Pinto, Paulo Sousa, Costinha, Ricardo Carvalho, Luís Figo, Nuno Gomes, Pauleta, Deco, Simão and a young Cristiano Ronaldo. After their success in UEFA Euro 2016 beating France in the final, a new generation of players were progressing through the ranks of Europe mainly through the Primera Liga. They won the inaugural UEFA Nations League beating the Netherlands in the 2019 UEFA Nations League Final and this new generation of players includes Cristiano Ronaldo, João Felix, Bruno Fernandes, Bernardo Silva, Diogo Jota, Ruben Neves, Ruben Dias, João Cancelo, Diogo Dalot, Raphaël Guerreiro and Nuno Mendes.

Spain (2006–2014)

This generation of players (most notably including Xavi, Andrés Iniesta, Sergio Ramos, Xabi Alonso, Fernando Torres, David Villa, Gerard Piqué, Sergio Busquets, Carles Puyol, Iker Casillas, Cesc Fàbregas and David Silva) helped Spain win the UEFA European Championship in 2008 and 2012, and the FIFA World Cup in 2010, making them the first team ever to win the World Cup and both continental championships either side of it. They also reached the final of the 2013 FIFA Confederations Cup. During this time, Spain dominated the FIFA World Rankings, topping the rankings almost uninterrupted for six years, between July 2008 and July 2014.

Yugoslavia (1987–1992)
Yugoslavia's generation of young footballers won the 1987 FIFA World Youth Championship and finished runner-up at the 1990 UEFA European Under-21 Championship. The nation then reached the quarter-finals of the 1990 FIFA World Cup and, a year later, a Red Star Belgrade team featuring many of the national team's stars became the first Yugoslav side to ever win the European Cup. Yugoslavia qualified for UEFA Euro 1992 with seven wins from eight matches and the best goalscoring record and goal difference of any team during the qualifying phase. However, the team was disqualified prior to the tournament due to the Yugoslav Wars (it was replaced by the eventual champion, Denmark) and did not play together again after the country's division. Several players from the Yugoslav team went on to finish in third place at the 1998 World Cup with Croatia. This pre-dissolution golden generation in soccer was also mirrored by a golden generation of Yugoslav basketball that won the 1990 FIBA World Championship. Notable players from this generation include Alen Bokšić, Robert Prosinečki, Igor Štimac, Robert Jarni, Dejan Savićević, Siniša Mihajlović, Davor Šuker, Zvonimir Boban and Vladimir Jugović.

Africa

Egypt (2006-2010) 

Egypt's Golden Generation won three consecutive Africa Cup of Nations and beat Ivory Coast's Golden Generation in the Final of the 2006 Africa Cup of Nations and Algeria's Golden Generation in the semi final of the 2010 Africa Cup of Nations, plus they did one of the best performances in the 2009 FIFA Confederations Cup because they almost tied with Brazil in the opening match then winning at the time World Champions Italy 1-0 and only losing to the United States, however due to overconfidence and bad luck in the team, they failed to qualify for the 2010 FIFA World Cup. Key players are Mohamed Aboutrika, Essam El Hadary, Gedo, Hossam Hassan, Mohamed Zidan, and Ahmed Hassan, this generation was led by Hassan Shehata who is considered one of the greatest Egyptian national football team coaches.

Algeria (2010–2014; 2019–2022) 
The Algerian team which reached the round of 16 of the 2014 FIFA World Cup has been described as a golden generation or the "second golden generation" of Algerian football in reference to the side which reached the 1982 and 1986 World Cups and won the 1990 African Cup of Nations. Key players in the 2010–2014 period included Madjid Bougherra, Mehdi Lacen, Djamel Mesbah, Hassan Yebda, Sofiane Feghouli, Islam Slimani, Yacine Brahimi and Raïs M'Bolhi. Algeria later won the 2019 Africa Cup of Nations and the 2021 FIFA Arab Cup with the likes of Riyad Mahrez, Ismaël Bennacer, Youcef Belaïli and Baghdad Bounedjah, but crashed out of the group stage of the next edition of the AFCON and failed to qualify for the 2022 FIFA World Cup.

Ivory Coast (2006–2015) 
Despite winning the 1992 edition of the Africa Cup of Nations, the country saw an outpour of talent during the first half of the 2000s (decade). The majority of this generation consisted of talented players who enjoyed considerable success in Europe. Led by Didier Drogba (who is also the national team's highest ever goalscorer), several other players found contracts in the biggest football stages in the world, such as brothers Yaya and Kolo Touré, Didier Zokora, Emmanuel Eboué, Cheick Tioté, Gervinho and Salomon Kalou. During this period, Ivory Coast managed its first FIFA World Cup appearances in 2006, 2010 and 2014. They also won the Africa Cup of Nations in 2015, as well as, reaching the finals in 2006 and 2012.

South America

Chile (2007–2017)
The backbone of the Chile team which won back to back Copa América titles in 2015 and in 2016 came from the U-20 squad that finished third at the 2007 FIFA U-20 World Cup in Canada (most notably Alexis Sánchez and Arturo Vidal). However, in 2017, they finished runners-up to Germany's B team at the Confederations Cup and then inexplicably failed to qualify for the 2018 World Cup, despite most of the squad being in the prime of their careers, following unexpected losses to Bolivia and Paraguay in qualification. Other notable players during this period include Claudio Bravo, Eduardo Vargas, Mark Gonzalez, Mauricio Isla, Jean Beausejour, Gary Medel and Gonzalo Jara.

Colombia (2012–2022)
The current Colombia team are considered as the "Second Golden Generation" of Colombia, in reference to Colombia's Golden Generation from the 1980s and 1990s. Star players James Rodríguez, Juan Cuadrado and Radamel Falcao helped the team reach the 2014 FIFA World Cup knockout stage after topping a group featuring Greece, Ivory Coast and Japan, winning all three games. Colombia then beat Uruguay in the round of sixteen, before suffering a 1–2 defeat to host nation Brazil, in the quarter-finals. James Rodríguez was the tournament top goalscorer; and Colombia earned the FIFA Fair Play Award. At the Copa América Centenario, Colombia won third place after beating the United States 1–0. At the 2018 FIFA World Cup, Colombia were considered group favourites for Group H; featuring Japan, Poland and Senegal. Following a 1–2 defeat to Japan in which they went down to 10-men in under five minutes, Colombia beat Poland 3–0 and later beat Senegal 1–0 to qualify as group winners. They were knocked out by England in the round of sixteen; losing on penalties. Between June and August 2016, Colombia were ranked as 3rd in both FIFA and Elo ranking.
Other key players from this generation include Carlos Sánchez, Fredy Guarín, Jackson Martínez, Cristián Zapata and Carlos Bacca.

North America

Canada (2020–) 
The golden generation of Canada's national team was marked by the arrival of a generation of new young players, led by the first Canadian UEFA Champions League winner Alphonso Davies of Bayern Munich, the most expensive Canadian soccer player in history, as well as Jonathan David, who joined Lille for €30 million in 2020, and the establishment of the Canadian Premier League, the first fully professional soccer league in the country.

Canada ended 2021 40th in the FIFA World Rankings, its highest-ever position at the time, earning the honour of "Most Improved Side" after having started the year 72nd. On February 10, 2022, Canada moved up to 33rd, its highest-ever position to date.

On March 27, 2022, Canada finished top of the final qualification group in CONCACAF with the most goals scored and the fewest goals conceded, qualifying for its first World Cup in 36 years.

United States (2021–) 
After infamously failing to qualify during the 2018 FIFA World Cup qualification with an aging team, a large influx of young new American soccer talent arose during the COVID-19 pandemic playing for top European clubs led by Chelsea player Christian Pulisic, who's transfer to the club made him the most expensive North American player of all time. Key players include Giovanni Reyna, Weston McKennie, Brenden Aaronson, Sergiño Dest, Yunus Musah, Timothy Weah, and Tyler Adams. The new young group has widely been described as America's golden generation.

This new group won the inaugural CONCACAF Nations League in 2021. The team set a U.S. men's program record for wins in a calendar year, with 17 wins, 2 losses, and 3 draws. The group was the youngest squad in the world to qualify in the 2022 FIFA World Cup qualification at an average age of 23.8 years old. During the 2022 FIFA World Cup, the USMNT had the second-youngest squad of the tournament at an average age of 25, with Tyler Adams being the youngest captain.

Ice hockey

Canada (2005–2016)
Born in the mid-1980s, the Canadian national men's hockey team has had a golden generation which contributed to five consecutive IIHF World U20 Championships between 2005 and 2009, and subsequently won back-to-back gold medals at the 2010 and 2014 Winter Olympics, and gold at the 2016 World Cup of Hockey. Twelve players have also won the Stanley Cup and six are members of the Triple Gold Club.

Finland (2014–)
Born in the mid- to late 1990s, the Finland men's national ice hockey team has had a golden generation of young stars. Finland won the IIHF World U20 Championships in 2014, 2016 and 2019. In the 2016 NHL Draft, three of the top five picks were from Finland.

See also
Dynasty (sports)
Golden age (metaphor)

References

Cultural generations
Nicknamed groups of association football players
Nicknamed groups of Olympic competitors
Nicknamed groups of sportspeople